is a Japanese footballer who plays for JEF United Chiba as a right full-back, and occasionally as an attacking midfielder.

He previously played for JEF United between 2007 and 2013.

Club career

A native of Chiba, Yonekura attended Yachiyo High School in his home prefecture and after graduating he signed for local club JEF United in 2007.   In total he would spend 7 seasons with the Ichihara-based club with the first two being spent in J1 League and the latter 5 in J2.   Playing as either a right sided defender or midfielder he went on to make over 150 league appearances and score 20 goals for JEF.

During the 2013 season, Yonekura put in an outstanding performance in the 3-0 home victory over then J2 side Gamba Osaka.   Despite this setback, Gamba went on to be crowned J2 champions in 2013 and signed Yonekura ahead of their return to Japan's top flight in 2014.

His first season in Osaka would prove to be a memorable one as Gamba wrapped up a domestic treble; lifting the J1 trophy in addition to the J.League Cup and Emperor's Cup.   Yonekura scored 3 times in 34 appearances in all competitions and was a part of a rotation system with fellow full-backs Oh Jae-suk and Hiroki Fujiharu.

2015 saw him play almost 50 times across 5 competitions as Gamba once again lifted the Emperor's Cup, defeating Urawa Red Diamonds in the final, won the Japanese Super Cup, also against Urawa, and reached the semi-finals of the AFC Champions League before going down to Chinese side Guangzhou Evergrande.

Gamba didn't lift any silverware between 2016 and 2018 and Yonekura again spent much of that period rotating with Korean Oh Jae-suk.   He fell out of favour with head-coach Kenta Hasegawa towards the end of his reign in 2017 and made only 13 league appearances that season.   However the following year under the management of first, Brazilian Levir Culpi and, following his sacking, Tsuneyasu Miyamoto, Yonekura began to play more regularly, scoring once in 26 games as Gamba eventually finished up 9th in the league standings.

International career

On 23 July 2015, Japan's coach Vahid Halilhodžić called him for the upcoming 2015 EAFF East Asian Cup. He featured twice during the competition as Japan ended up in 4th place.

Club Career statistics

 1 includes J. League Championship, Japanese Super Cup and Suruga Bank Championship appearances.

Reserves performance

Last Updated: 21 March 2018

National team statistics

Honors
J1 League – 2014
Emperor's Cup – 2014, 2015
J. League Cup – 2014
Japanese Super Cup – 2015

References

External links
 
 

1988 births
Living people
Association football people from Chiba Prefecture
Japanese footballers
Japan international footballers
J1 League players
J2 League players
JEF United Chiba players
Gamba Osaka players
Gamba Osaka U-23 players
Association football defenders
Association football midfielders